Valentin the Good is a 1942 Czech comedy film directed by Martin Frič.

Cast
 Lilly Hodácová as Julie Kahounová
 Oldřich Nový as Valentin Plavec
 Hana Vítová as Helena Bártová
 Theodor Pištěk as Kudrna, Valentin's uncle
 Mila Spazierova-Hezka as Singer in Sakura
 Zdeňka Baldová as Maruska Kudrnová
 Eman Fiala as Eman Voborník
 Milada Gampeová as Helen's mother
 Ladislav Pešek as Rudolf Brejsovec
 Josef Belský as Manager of Sakura
 Jaroslav Marvan as Bures
 Anna Letenská

References

External links
 

1942 films
1942 comedy films
1940s Czech-language films
Czechoslovak black-and-white films
Films directed by Martin Frič
Czech comedy films
1940s Czech films